John Allen Southwood (born 18 January 1943) is an Australian sprint canoeist who competed from the late 1960s to the mid-1970s. Competing in three Summer Olympics, He earned his best finish of eighth in the K-2 500 m event at Montreal in 1976.

References
Sports-reference.com profile

1943 births
Australian male canoeists
Canoeists at the 1968 Summer Olympics
Canoeists at the 1972 Summer Olympics
Canoeists at the 1976 Summer Olympics
Living people
Olympic canoeists of Australia
20th-century Australian people